Golden Retriever is an American musical duo from Portland, Oregon.

Jonathan Sielaff (formerly of Au) and Matt Carlson both played in the experimental music community in the Pacific Northwest in the mid-2000s. Sielaff played with Carlson's band Parenthetical Girls. They founded Golden Retriever in 2008 and began releasing albums on cassette and CD-R. In 2012, the group signed with Thrill Jockey and released Occupied with the Unspoken; Seer followed in 2014.

Members
Jonathan Sielaff - bass clarinet
Matt Carlson - analog synthesizer

Discography
Golden Retriever (Root Strata, 2010)
Static Rain (Gift Tapes, 2010)
Golden Retriever 2 (Bucket Factory, 2010)
Arda Viraf (Agents of Chaos, 2011)
Emergent Layer (NNA Tapes, 2011)
Light Cones (Root Strata, 2012)
Occupied with the Unspoken (Thrill Jockey, 2012)
Seer (Thrill Jockey, 2014)
Rotations (Thrill Jockey, 2017)
Rain Shadow with Chuck Johnson (Thrill Jockey, 2020)

References

Musical groups from Oregon
American experimental musical groups
2008 establishments in Oregon
Musical groups established in 2008
American musical duos